Palmerston (population 2,599) is an unincorporated community in the south end of the town of Minto, in the north part of Wellington County, in Ontario, Canada.

History 
Palmerston was a key division point for the Grand Trunk and later the Canadian National Railway in Southwestern Ontario with 65 subdivisions; Owen Sound, Kincardine, Durham, Fergus, Guelph Junction and Stratford. In its original concept the railroad was to run from Guelph to Southampton, Ontario and would not have gone through Palmerston. Listowel needed to be linked to the railroad and it was decided to bend the route toward Listowel. It was also decided that a yard with maintenance shops would be needed. The mainline under Canadian National ownership became part of the Fergus, Owen Sound and Southampton Subdivisions. Passenger service ceased in 1971. The subdivisions were abandoned starting with Fergus to Palmerston August 1983, Harriston Jct. to Port Elgin and Southampton in 1988, Guelph to Fergus 1988, and Palmerston to Harriston 1995. all rail service terminated in 1996 with CN abandoning the line from Stratford to Harriston.

When the railroad decided to build a junction and maintenance sheds between Guelph, Harriston and Listowel, this also included a station. One of the active supporters of the railroad was John McDermott, Reeve of Wallace and, because of this support, the railways decided to let McDermot name the station. He named it Palmerston in 1870 in honour of Henry John Temple, the third Viscount Palmerston. As soon as the railroad decided where it would build, people started buying property around the area for businesses and homes.

Another historic plaque discusses the Ontario Vaccine Farm, opened in 1885 by Dr. Alexander Stewart in order to produce smallpox vaccine. Until about 1907, much of the vaccine used in Ontario was produced here; later, farms in the U.S. took much of the business. Stewart died in 1911 but the farm continued under H.B. Coleman until 1916. Afterwards, the farm closed and program was taken over by the University of Toronto.

In 1995, the Progressive Conservative government of Ontario began to reduce the number of total municipalities in the province. Effective 1 Jan. 1999, The Town of Minto is composed of the former towns of Harriston and Palmerston, the former village of Clifford, and the surrounding rural area of the former Minto Township.

Schools
Minto has public schools situated in Harriston, Clifford and Palmerston.  Norwell District Secondary School is the secondary school for Minto and surrounding areas as governed by the Upper Grand District School Board.  The schools located in Palmerston are:

 Palmerston Public School (K-8)
 Norwell District Secondary School

Entertainment
The Norgan Theatre is a small theatre located on Main Street in Palmerston. It was built by the successful businessman George Norgan who had made his fortune in Vancouver, BC. He came home to Palmerston in 1947 and noticed the lack of leisure opportunities in the town. 
To address this situation, he personally donated $50,000 for the construction of a movie theatre. It opened on August 18, 1947 and was named after him.
The Norgan Theatre was renovated in 2007.
The Norgan is run by volunteers and therefore the price for tickets is fairly inexpensive: $8.00 per adult and $5.00 for those 13 and under.

Notable people
Lorne Ferguson - former NHL forward who played for the Boston Bruins, Detroit Red Wings and Chicago Blackhawks
Jim Reid -  Former CFL full back for Hamilton Tiger Cats and Ottawa Roughriders
Nick Spaling - Forward for the Genève-Servette HC, Spaling was born in Palmerston but raised in Drayton, Ontario

References

External links

Town of Minto website
Town of Minto Chamber of Commerce

Former towns in Ontario
Communities in Wellington County, Ontario
Populated places disestablished in 1999